Worst case analysis was, from 1978 until 1986, a doctrine under  which mandated that an environmental impact statement include such an analysis:

It led to a 1989 SCOTUS decision, written by John Paul Stevens and reported in Robertson v. Methow Valley Citizens Council, after a decision by GOODWIN and FERGUSON, STEPHENS to reverse the Federal District Court of Oregon ruling that the Regional Forester did not violate any laws when he issued a special use permit for a ski resort development in a roadless area in Okanogan National Forest in Washington state.

The Rehnquist Court concluded

References

Environmental science
Environmental law in the United States
Environmental impact assessment
Environmental impact in the United States